Vriesea friburgensis is a plant species in the genus Vriesea. This species is an epiphyte native to Bolivia, Paraguay, Argentina, and Brazil.

Three varieties are recognized:

Vriesea friburgensis var. friburgensis - eastern + southern Brazil
Vriesea friburgensis var. paludosa (L.B.Sm.) L.B.Sm. - southeastern Brazil from São Paulo to Rio Grande do Sul
Vriesea friburgensis var. tucumanensis (Mez) L.B.Sm. - most of species range

Cultivars
 Vriesea 'Jubilation'
 [[Vriesea Little Dumplin'|Vriesea 'Little Dumplin]]
 xVrieslandsia 'Red Dawn'

Ecology
The large infructescences of the plant dry up and may remain standing for a year or more, during which time they are inhabited by a variety of insect species and other arthropods. Several species of ants, termites, and bees build nests in the dry fruiting structure. Surveys have revealed the nests of ants in the genera Camponotus, Pseudomyrmex, and Solenopsis, and termites of the genera Cortaritermes and Velocitermes''. Other inhabitants of the plant include giant butterfly-moths, hoverflies, beetles, pseudoscorpions, springtails, and spiders.

References

friburgensis
Flora of South America
Epiphytes
Plants described in 1894